The 1962 Texas Western Miners football team was an American football team that represented Texas Western College (now known as University of Texas at El Paso) as an independent during the 1962 NCAA University Division football season. In its first and only season under head coach Bum Phillips, the team compiled a 4–5 record and was outscored by a total of 144 to 84.

Schedule

References

Texas Western
UTEP Miners football seasons
Texas Western Miners football